The 2018 Auburn Tigers softball team is an American softball team, representing Auburn University for the 2018 NCAA softball season. The Auburn Tigers play their home games at Jane B. Moore Field.  The Tigers have a new coach, after former coach Clint Myers resigned his post on August 24, 2017.  Mickey Dean was named as head coach on September 14, 2017, after coaching at James Madison University for 5 seasons.

Auburn hopes to improve upon its 49-12 record a year ago that ended in the Super Regionals at the hands of the eventual National Champion Oklahoma Sooners.

The Tigers were voted to finish 6th in the SEC in the Preseason Coaches' Poll, and opened 2018 ranked 13th in the USA Today/NFCA Softball national preseason poll.

Roster
2018 Auburn Softball Roster

Coaching staff

Schedule 
2018 Auburn Tigers Softball Schedule

|-
!colspan=9| Plainsman Invite (Auburn, AL)

|-
!colspan=9|

|-
!colspan=9| Tiger Invite (Auburn, AL)

|-
!colspan=9|

|-
!colspan=9| Mary Nutter Classic (Cathedral City, CA)

|-
!colspan=9| Wilson/DeMarini Classic (Auburn, AL)

|-
!colspan=9|

Ranking movement

References

Auburn
Auburn Tigers softball seasons